The Queen Class was Joseph Armstrong's last class of 2–2–2 express engine for the Great Western Railway, larger than the Sir Daniel Class of about a decade earlier. They worked express trains for almost 30 years, and were in effect the predecessors of the larger Singles of William Dean.

The locomotives
The "Queens" started life as a single prototype, No. 55 Queen herself, built at Swindon in 1873. A further 20 locomotives were constructed in 1875, numbered 999, 1000 and 1116–1133. No. 999 was named Sir Alexander and sometimes the later series is referred to as the Sir Alexander Class, though in fact the locomotives were essentially the same as No. 55. They all had  diameter driving wheels and  cylinders. The class's duties were the expresses on the London-Swindon-Gloucester and London-Wolverhampton routes. Accordingly, No. 55 became the principal GWR royal locomotive, carrying the royal coat of arms for royal journeys, though sometimes this decoration was applied to other, substitute engines.

As with many GWR locomotives of the time, the individual members of the class were much modified in detail, at Wolverhampton as well as Swindon, with the addition of cabs, different chimneys and various types of boiler; some in their later years had Belpaire fireboxes, which gave a much more modern appearance. After 1900, the class was demoted to secondary duties in various parts of the system, and all were withdrawn between 1903 and 1914. All but a handful of these engines had  to their credit at the time of withdrawal.

Names
Ten of the class carried names, as follows:
 55 Queen
 999 Sir Alexander
 1118 Prince Christian
 1119 Princess of Wales
 1122 Beaconsfield
 1123 Salisbury
 1128 Duke of York
 1129 Princess May
 1130 Gooch (temporary name, c.1900)
 1132 Prince of Wales

References

Sources

Queen
Standard gauge steam locomotives of Great Britain
2-2-2 locomotives
Railway locomotives introduced in 1873
Scrapped locomotives